Trimbak Mukundrao Kamble was an Indian politician and Ambedkarite activist. He was the leader of Republican Party Of India (Democratic), a splinter faction of the Republican Party of India. Kamble was from Maharashtra and a member of the Maharashtra Legislative Council. He was a popular Dalit leader.

Kamble was in politics since the formation of the Indian Dalit Panthers. He was a leader of the Namantar Andolan (Name Change Movement) of Marathwada University and an active leader in the Dalit Panthers. During 1990–96, he served as a legislator in the Maharashtra Legislative Council. Kamble was the former president of the Republican Party of India (A). He was an Ambedkarite activist and a Buddhist. He left the party after differences with senior leader Ramdas Athawale and formed the new party Republican Party of India (Democratic), and became its president.

He died at age of 67 in Vivekanand Hospital and Research Center Latur on 28 September 2013.

References

1940s births
2013 deaths
People from Latur
Members of the Maharashtra Legislative Council
Republican Party of India politicians
Place of birth missing
Marathi politicians
Indian Buddhists
Social workers
Social workers from Maharashtra
Dalit activists
Activists from Maharashtra
20th-century Indian politicians
21st-century Indian politicians
Republican Party of India (Athawale) politicians